Seeley Lake is a census-designated place (CDP) in Missoula County, Montana, United States. It is part of the 'Missoula, Montana Metropolitan Statistical Area'. The town sits beside the 1,031.5 acres lake Seeley Lake. The population was 1,659 at the 2010 census, an increase from its population of 1,436 in 2000.

The community of Seeley Lake is named for Jasper B. Seely who built a cabin on what was in 1881 known as Clearwater Lake. Seely served as the first ranger on the Lewis and Clarke Forest Reserve. The first road to Seeley Lake came in 1895.

Geography
Seeley Lake is located at  (47.166892, -113.466817).

Climate

According to the Köppen Climate Classification system, Seeley Lake has a warm-summer humid continental climate, abbreviated "Dfb" on climate maps.

Aftermath of Rice Ridge Fire
In late summer 2017, Seeley Lake suffered an extended period of hazardous air quality as a result of the Rice Ridge Fire, prompting local officials to urge all residents to evacuate their homes. Scooper aircraft were used to fetch water from Seeley Lake to fight the fire. A followup study will measure the health impacts of the smoke.

Demographics

As of the census of 2010, there were 1,659 people, 589 households, and 411 families residing in the CDP. The population density was 131.9 people per square mile (50.9/km). There were 938 housing units at an average density of 86.2 per square mile (33.3/km). The racial makeup of the CDP was 96.94% White, 0.07% African American, 1.46% Native American, 0.21% Asian, 0.49% from other races, and 0.84% from two or more races. Hispanic or Latino of any race were 1.46% of the population.

There were 589 households, out of which 29.2% had children under the age of 18 living with them, 59.4% were married couples living together, 5.1% had a female householder with no husband present, and 30.1% were non-families. 24.3% of all households were made up of individuals, and 6.3% had someone living alone who was 65 years of age or older. The average household size was 2.44 and the average family size was 2.89.

In the CDP, the population was spread out, with 25.3% under the age of 18, 5.2% from 18 to 24, 28.3% from 25 to 44, 29.5% from 45 to 64, and 11.8% who were 65 years of age or older. The median age was 41 years. For every 100 females, there were 113.4 males. For every 100 females age 18 and over, there were 112.1 males.

The median income for a household in the CDP was $35,101, and the median income for a family was $38,188. Males had a median income of $30,000 versus $18,269 for females. The per capita income for the CDP was $18,825. About 7.0% of families and 10.6% of the population were below the poverty line, including 14.4% of those under age 18 and 4.8% of those age 65 or over.

Education 
Seeley-Swan High School provides education for 9th through 12th grade. They are known as the Blackhawks.

The Missoula Public Library has a branch location in Seeley Lake.

See also
Camp Paxson Boy Scout Camp
Larch ball

References

External links

 Seeley Lake Chamber of Commerce

Census-designated places in Missoula County, Montana
Census-designated places in Montana